Charles Furneaux (1835–1913) was born in Boston and became a drawing instructor in that area. For many years he lived in the town of Melrose, Massachusetts.  In 1880, Furneaux moved to Hawaii, where he cultivated the friendship of King Kalakaua and other members of the Hawaiian royal family, from whom he later received several commissions. In the late 1880s,he was commissioned in Honolulu by Alexander Joy Cartwright, widely credited as the "father of baseball" and another dear friend of King Kalakaua, to paint the only oil portrait of his 72-year life. While living in Honolulu he taught at the private schools Punahou and St. Albans (now known as Iolani School).  In 1885, he received the order of Chevalier of Kapiolani from King Kalakaua in 'recognition of his services in advancing Hawaiian art'.  He died in Hawaii in 1913.

His reputation is mainly based on the paintings he executed in Hawaii, especially those of erupting volcanoes.  The Bishop Museum (Honolulu), the Brooklyn Museum, the Honolulu Museum of Art, Iolani Palace (Honolulu) and Mount Holyoke College Art Museum (South Hadley, Massachusetts) are among the public collections holding works by Charles Furneaux.

Auction record
The auction record for a painting by Charles Furneaux is $17,260 .  This record was set by Kilauea, a 16 by 24 inch oil painting on canvas sold Oct. 28, 1999 at Christie's (Los Angeles).

References
 Forbes, David W., "Encounters with Paradise: Views of Hawaii and its People, 1778-1941", Honolulu Academy of Arts, 1992, 91-201.

Footnotes

1835 births
1913 deaths
19th-century American painters
American male painters
20th-century American painters
Artists from Boston
Volcano School painters
American landscape painters
Recipients of the Royal Order of Kapiolani
19th-century American male artists
20th-century American male artists